Hypercompe extrema is a moth of the family Erebidae. It was described by Francis Walker in 1855. It is found in Mexico, Costa Rica and possibly Chile.

The wingspan is about 34 mm.

References

 

Hypercompe
Moths described in 1855